Saturday Sports Round-Up is an Australian television series which aired in Melbourne in 1957 on GTV-9. It debuted 26 January 1957, aired at 6:00PM Saturdays, and was hosted by Bert Bryant. It was described as "film and commentary of the day's events". It was the second sports series produced by a GTV-9, debuting two days after Eric Welch's Sports Album. At the time, television in Australia was limited to Sydney and Melbourne, and the vast majority of locally produced series were single-city only. The show originally aired in a 30-minute time-slot. It later aired in an unusual 25-minute time-slot.

See also

List of Australian television series

References

External links

1957 Australian television series debuts
1957 Australian television series endings
Black-and-white Australian television shows
English-language television shows
Australian sports television series